The AFL Hunter Central Coast is an Australian rules football competition in the Newcastle, Hunter Region and Central Coast regions of New South Wales. 

The Black Diamond Australian Football league was formed in 2000 and ran until the end of the 2018 season. Following the end of the 2018 season, the league was disbanded and a new league under the AFL NSW/ACT banner was formed; AFL Hunter Central Coast (AFLHCC). Teams in the AFLHCC's top division still play for the Black Diamond Cup.

History

Foundation
The league was formed in 2000 from a merger of the Newcastle Australian Football League and the Central Coast Australian Football League.

The proposition of an alternate competition started from rumblings during the 1990s that both competitions were dreadfully uneven and it was generally considered the administration, although keen and resolute, was far from what was needed to sustain a viable football league/s.

Visits from AFL executives to both the Newcastle and Central Coast took place during the 1999 season where they addressed meetings of delegates to look at alternatives to their contemporary competitions. It turns out these people were more interested in a proposed regional Club to participate in the Sydney Competition.

This proposal didn't address the concerns of the general situation of the local competitions. As there was no follow-up by the AFL both boards issued invitations to senior officials of all clubs to discuss the options for the future. A meeting was held at Mt Penang, Kariong in October 1999 where it was decided to merge both leagues to create a stronger more balanced competition.

The name "Black Diamond AFL" derives from the Black Diamond Cup which has been awarded to the Newcastle AFL Premiers since 1888.

League development

The Black Diamond AFL were successful in winning the Southern NSW AFL Championships in 2007, defeating the Riverina Football League.

In 2008 both Woy Woy and Singleton were removed from the First Grade competition and Lake Macquarie Crows were promoted to First Grade, meaning nine clubs competed for the premiership.

In 2011, Singleton returned to first grade, after winning the reserve premierships for 2009 and 2010. Nelson Bay however will only compete in Reserve Grade. Woy Woy, now known as the Peninsula Swans, will compete as a joint venture with the Gosford Tigers, allowing players at both clubs to compete in First Grade, Reserve Grade and Under 18s in 2011.

Gosford left the league in 2012, competing in the Sydney AFL for the next four seasons, before returning to the BDAFL in 2016.

The Maitland Saints also entered a senior side in 2012.  From 2012, the competition was restructured to allowed clubs to enter teams across Premier, 1st, 2nd and 3rd divisions.  This allowed smaller or newer clubs to field their firsts against the reserves or even third senior side of the stronger clubs.

Further clubs have joined the league in recent years, including Muswellbrook Cats and The Entrance Bateau Bay both entering senior sides 2014.  Muswellbrook had competed from 1988 until 1994 in the Newcastle AFL, and then later in the Tamworth AFL until 2013.

A women's competition started in 2015. Wyong Lakes was the first and only Central Coast club to enter the inaugural women's competition, along with Hunter-based clubs Newcastle City, Nelson Bay, Maitland, Warners Bay and Lake Macquarie. Killarney Vale and Gosford fielded their inaugural women's teams the following year. In 2018 the Ladypies, as the team came to be known, became the first and only Central Coast team to make the grand final in the women's competition.

In 2018, junior club Port Stephens fielded a Women's team, their first senior team in the club's history and Wallsend was revived as Wallsend-West Newcastle and fielded a team in the Women's competition and a team in the Black Diamond Plate. The league was renamed AFL Hunter Central Coast following the conclusion of the 2018 season under the banner of AFL NSW/ACT.

The 2019 season saw Lake Macquarie, with only one senior team, drop down to Black Diamond Plate (Reserves) and Nelson Bay was also reduced to just one senior team but still continued to play in the Black Diamond Cup. Newcastle City also fielded one women's team that same year, as the club had previously fielded two women's teams for two years.

2020 saw the league indefinitely suspended due to the 2019-20 coronavirus pandemic. Originally intending to start on April 4th, the pandemic prevented football from going ahead in the region until July 18th. The league was restructured with two women's divisions, respectively named Black Diamond Cup and Plate Women's, and a third men's competition, the Black Diamond Shield, introduced. The Black Diamond Plate will now consist of Terrigal-Avoca and Newcastle City's reserves sides and clubs with a single men's team with the Black Diamond Shield being the reserves competition for the rest of the clubs. Both Nelson Bay and Port Stephens are fielding a women's team as a joint venture for the 2020 season.

In late June 2021, the AFL Hunter Central Coast announced that all senior competitions, Central Coast and Hunter combined junior competitions and Central Coast-based junior competitions would cease due to the rapidly increasing number of coronavirus cases across the region, as the Central Coast was classed as part of Greater Sydney at the time. Round 10 was the last official round for the senior season with Central Coast and Hunter clubs competing.
Although informal senior matches between Hunter-based clubs and Hunter-based junior competitions were able to continue, the uncertainty of the coronavirus outbreak across the Hunter region in early August eventually saw all Hunter community senior and junior competitions ceased for 2021.

Senior Clubs

Former Clubs

Clubs with Juniors only 

Niagara Park-Ourimbah Dockers
Northern Giants (formerly Northern Lakes Power)
Saratoga Hawks
Woy Woy Peninsula Swans

Men's BDAFL/AFLHCC Premiers

Women's BDAFL/AFLHCC Premiers

Men's First Grade (Black Diamond Cup)

2015 Ladder

2016 Ladder

2017 Ladder

2018 Ladder

2019 Ladder

2020 Ladder

2021 Ladder (After Round 10)

Men's Second Grade (Black Diamond Plate)

2015 Ladder

2016 Ladder

2017 Ladder

2018 Ladder

2019 Ladder

2020 Ladder 
Due to coronavirus concerns in the Upper Hunter, Muswellbrook withdrew their men and women's teams after Round 5 for the remainder of the season.

2021 Ladder (After Round 10)

Men's Third Grade (Black Diamond Shield)

2015 Ladder

2016 Ladder

2017 Ladder 

After the 2017 season, the league was changed from having three senior men's grade to two, consisting of the Black Diamond Cup (Premier Division) and Black Diamond Plate (Reserves), onward from the 2018 season. However, a third men's competition was reintroduced in 2020, the Black Diamond Shield, which consists of the reserves sides of every club except Terrigal-Avoca, Newcastle City, Nelson Bay, Muswellbrook, The Entrance Bateau Bay, Lake Macquarie, Wallsend-West Newcastle and Port Stephens, who currently only field a senior women's team.

2020 Ladder

2021 Ladder (After Round 10) 
Singleton also had a Reserve Grade side competing in the 2021 Black Diamond Shield, but eventually pulled out of the competition after Round 3 after forfeiting their first two games for the year.

Black Diamond Women's football competition

2015 Ladder 
An open age women's competition commenced in 2015. Initially starting with 6 teams the competition expanded to 10 the following year. The 2017 season saw 2 new teams and the 2018 season saw 16 teams.

2016 Ladder

2017 Ladder

2018 Ladder

2019 Ladder 

The 2020 season saw the introduction of a second women's competition. Known as the Black Diamond Plate Women's, it would act as the Second Division of the Black Diamond Cup Women's, which became the First Division women's competition.

2020 Ladders

Women's First Grade (Black Diamond Cup Women)

Women's Second Grade (Black Diamond Plate Women) 
Due to coronavirus concerns in the Upper Hunter, Muswellbrook withdrew their women's and men's team after Round 5.

2021 Ladders

Women's First Grade (Black Diamond Cup Women, after Round 9)

Women's Second Grade (Black Diamond Plate Women, after Round 10)

Newcastle Central Coast Umpires Association
 NCCUA

The Newcastle Central Coast Umpires Association provides umpires to the following competitions:
 
• AFL Hunter Coast (Senior Football League on the Central Coast, Newcastle and Hunter regions);

• AFL Hunter Coast: 
 Central Coast Juniors (Junior Football League on the Central Coast)
 Hunter Juniors (Junior Football League in the Newcastle and Hunter regions)

The NCCUA not only provides umpires to these competitions but provides training and support to these umpires.

The NCCUA trains at the following locations, starting at 5:30pm:

Tuesdays - Lisarow Sports Ground, Lisarow

Wednesday - Tulkaba Park, Teralba

The Newcastle Central Coast Umpires Association is led by President Jake Lowe, Treasurer Ashley Borg, Secretary, Tomas Steward and a committee of several umpires.

The current Umpire's Coach is Christine Burrows. She works across Junior and Senior Football umpiring pathways.

There are also several people who assist both Christine in various coaching and mentoring roles.

See also
 AFL NSW/ACT
 Australian rules football in New South Wales
 Newcastle Australian Football League
 Newcastle Rugby League
 Newcastle & Hunter Rugby League
 Central Coast Division Rugby League
 Group 3 Rugby League
 Group 21 Rugby League

References

External links
 

Sport in Newcastle, New South Wales
Australian rules football competitions in New South Wales